Jane A. Cauley is a Distinguished Professor in the Department of Epidemiology and an Associate Dean for Research at the University of Pittsburgh.

Education
Cauley received a BSN in Nursing at Boston College in 1975. She then continued to receive a MPH in Epidemiology/Public Health Nursing at the University of Pittsburgh in 1980 and a Doctor of Public Health in Epidemiology in 1983.

Career
Cauley has been involved in women's health for over 25 years and is the Principal Investigator (PI) of cohort studies such as the Study of Osteoporotic Fracture (SOF) and the Osteoporotic Fracture Risk in Older Men (MrOS). She has made improvements for understanding osteoporosis in older men and women. She was the Co-PI for the Women's Health Initiative (WHI), study wide Chair of the Osteoporosis, and for almost throughout the whole trial she also was the Calcium and Vitamin D Committee. She is currently a Co-investigator for the Study of Women's Health Across the Nation (SWAN) for women transition-midlife to elder status-particular emphases on skeletal health, physical function and body composition changes, and a PI of a SWAN which examines novel measures of hip strength.

Research areas
Cauley's research interests are on epidemiology of osteoporosis, osteoporosis treatment and the consequences of osteoporosis. She is also interested in breast cancer which is why she served on the American Society of Clinical Oncology Writing Group, about the use of bisphosphonates in women with breast cancer. She also focused on women's health and ageing, falls, the interaction between endogenous and exogenous hormones, risk factors, inflammation, and disease outcomes. She also examines the physical and psychological changes in postmenopausal women.

Awards received
1986  NHLBI, FIRST Award: Epidemiology of Apo-Lipoprotein in Older Women (HL40489)
1990 Public Health Honor Society, Delta Omega Society
1996  American Epidemiological Society Membership
2002  Pittsburgh Post-Gazette: 1 of 12 scientists chosen as making a difference in your health
2003  American Society for Bone & Mineral Research (ASMBR), Elected Council Member
2004  University of Pittsburgh, Graduate School of Public Health, (GSPH)  Distinguished Alumni Award
2004  University of Pittsburgh, GSPH, President, Faculty Senate Executive Committee
2011  University of Pittsburgh, Provost's Award for Excellence in Mentoring
2011  ASBMR, Frederic C. Bartter Award
2014  SmithBucklin Leadership Institute, Member
2014  European Calcified Tissue Society, Golden Femur Award
2014  Reuters Influential Scientists, The World's Most Influential Scientific Minds
2016  President of the American Society for Bone and Mineral Research

Works

References

University of Pittsburgh faculty
University of Pittsburgh School of Public Health alumni
Living people
American women epidemiologists
American epidemiologists
20th-century American women scientists
21st-century American women scientists
Year of birth missing (living people)
Connell School of Nursing alumni
American women academics